P25R South Richmond High School is a special education school in Staten Island, New York City for children ages 10 to 21. It is a part of the New York City Department of Education. The main facility is in Pleasant Plains while an annex is located in the former P.S. 4 building in Charleston. The school operates in many sites throughout Staten Island.

The school, a part of NYCDOE District 75, has nine classes of students. Its curriculum includes education subjects and subjects on daily life skills. Activities in the daily life skills coursework include cleaning, cooking, visiting libraries, and shopping.

References

External links
South Richmond High School

Public middle schools in Staten Island
Public high schools in Staten Island